Michele Cantu (born June 24, 1988, in Monterrey, Nuevo León) is a Mexican figure skater. She is the 2006 Mexican national champion and qualified to the free skate at five Four Continents Championships. She also competed at one Grand Prix event, the 2006 Skate America. She has three siblings – Mexican international figure skater Ana Cecilia Cantu, Paulina Cantu, and Homero Cantu.

Programs

Competitive highlights
GP: Grand Prix; JGP: Junior Grand Prix

References

External links

Living people
1988 births
Mexican female single skaters
Sportspeople from Monterrey